The National Immigration Agency of the Ministry of the Interior (NIA) is the statutory agency under the Ministry of Interior of the Republic of China (Taiwan) which is responsible for immigration, entry and exit security, border services and registration of foreigners. The agency is headed by the Director General. The current Director-General is Jeff Jia-Jun Yang.

The agency does not manage customs which is managed by the Ministry of Finance.

History

The agency was established in early 2007 to deal with immigration and border control. This include the care and guidance of new immigrants, exit and entry control, the inspection on illegal immigrants, the forcible deportation, and the prevention of trafficking in persons. The agency also deals with documents of foreigners and nationals of the People's Republic of China (including mainland China, Hong Kong and Macau).

Prior to that it was known as the Taiwan Garrison Command and Taiwan Province Police Department. It was initially in charge of Taiwan's border control for both military personnel and civilians respectively. In 1952, Military Personnel and Civilians Exit and Entry United Scrutiny Department was established and became the authority for border control.

In March 1957, the department's name was changed to Entry and Exit Control Department, subordinated to Taiwan Vigilance Headquarters and then to Taiwan Garrison Headquarters created in July 1958. In 1972, the government delegated border control, originally under the defense establishment, to a common administrative agency in response to the needs for social development and consequently the Immigration Bureau under the National Police Agency was established.

For years, Taiwan's border control and immigration had been separately administered by various agencies, resulting in the administrative inefficiency. The Immigration Act was promulgated on 21 May 1999, which proposed the National Immigration Agency or NIA, shall be established under the Ministry of the Interior (Taiwan) to be responsible of border control and immigration. Subsequently, other statutes related to the NIA were also drafted and then passed by the Legislative Yuan on 8 November 2005 and promulgated by the President on 11 November 2005. Therefore, the NIA has been officially established since 2 January 2007.

Department structure

The National Immigration Agency is organised in the following structure.
Entry and Exit Affairs Division
Immigration Affairs Division
International Affairs Division
Immigration Information Division
Secretariat
Personnel Office
Accounting Office
Civil Service Ethics Office

Immigration and Border Enforcement
Service Affairs Corps
Detention Affairs Corps
Specialized Operations Corps
Border Affairs Corps

Transportation
The NIA building is accessible within walking distance West from Xiaonanmen MRT station of the Taipei Metro.

See also
 Ministry of the Interior (Taiwan)
 Executive Yuan
 Resident Certificate
 Exit & Entry Permit (Taiwan)
 Visa policy of Taiwan
 Household registration
 Taiwan passport
 Alien Resident Certificate
 National Identification Card (Republic of China)
 Human trafficking in Taiwan

References

External links

National Immigration Agency's Office Website 

2007 establishments in Taiwan
Executive Yuan
Government agencies established in 2007
Immigration services